The Dyas Hexagonal Barn is a historical building located near Bellevue in rural Jackson County, Iowa, United States. Built in 1921, it is a round barn measuring  around, with red horizontal siding on a stone foundation, a tin roof, and a central wood stave silo extending through the roof. Despite the common name, the building is actually eight-sided, and is also known as the Dyas Octagonal Barn. Originally the roof was flat or almost flat; it is one of four round barns known to have been built on the same farm. It has been listed on the National Register of Historic Places since 1986.

References

Infrastructure completed in 1921
Buildings and structures in Jackson County, Iowa
Barns on the National Register of Historic Places in Iowa
Polygonal barns in the United States
National Register of Historic Places in Jackson County, Iowa